Nikini Vassa (August Drizzle) is a 2013 Sri Lankan Sinhala drama film directed by Aruna Jayawardana and produced by Dr Kusumsiri De Silva. It stars Chandani Seneviratne and Jagath Manuwarna in lead roles along with Thumindu Dodantenna and Bimal Jayakodi. Music composed by Nadeeka Guruge. It is the 1190th Sri Lankan film in the Sinhala cinema. The film had positive reviews from international and local critics and won many international awards as well.

Plot

Cast
 Chandani Seneviratne as Somalatha
 Thumindu Dodantenna
 Jagath Manuwarna
 Bimal Jayakody
 Kumara Thirimadura
 Sarath Kothalawala
 W. Jayasiri
 Sulochana Gamage
 Lakshman Mendis
 Wajira Kodithuwakku
 Daya Alwis
 G.R Perera
 Nethalie Nanayakkara

Awards and Acclaims
 Derana Lux Film Awards 2011 - Best Upcoming director of the Year 2011 (Aruna Jayawardana)
LANKA LIVE FILM AWARDS 2014
BEST FILM
BEST SCRIPT
BEST ACTRESS
BEST ACTOR
BEST SUPPORTING ACTRESS
BEST DIRECTOR
BEST ART DIRECTOR
BEST EDITOR 
BEST CINEMATOGRAPHER
BEST MAKE UP
 Hiru Golden Film Awards 2014 - Popular Actor Nominations
 Hiru Golden Film Awards 2014 - Popular Actress Nominations
 Hiru Golden Film Awards 2014 - Best Film background Music (Nadeeka Guruge)
 Vessole Asian film festival – France – Best Asian Film Award – 2012
 Vessole Asian film festival – France – NETPAC Award – 2012
 Dubai International Film Festival – Jury's Special mention of the Best Actress Award – (Chandani Senevirathne) – 2012
 SIGNIS Asia Media Awards (SAMA) Silver Award - Chandani Seneviratne
 Represented of Singapore International Film Festival – 2012
 Represented of Busan International Film Festival – 2012
 Represented of Mumbai International Film Festival – 2012
 Represented of Kerala International Film Festival – 2012

References

External links
 ‘නිකිණි වැස්ස’ අධ්‍යක්ෂ අරුණ ජයවර්ධන සමඟ සෘජු කතාබහක්
 මහ පොළොවට අහිමි වැහි බිංදු නිකිණි වැස්ස

2013 films
2010s Sinhala-language films